Coenobita pseudorugosus is a species of terrestrial hermit crab, family Coenobitidae.

Discovery 

First described in 1988, C. pseudorugosus is known to occupy the Philippines and Southwest Madagascar. As suggested by its name, this species closely resembles the morphology and behavior of the more common C. rugosus. The very subtle differences may have delayed their identification as a distinct species.

Morphology 
When first described, the adult (terrestrial, non-larval form) were noted to have shield length (i.e. the anterior-posterior length of the dorsal cephalothorax carapace) between 5.6 and 12.1 mm. Subsequent surveys described their shield length as anywhere between 5 mm to 30 mm, and body weight of 100 mg to about 25 g. They tend to be tan-brown in color, with dark brown stripes over the shield, and additional scattered dark colorations in ventral aspect of ocular peduncle as well as parts of second and third pereiopods (walking legs).

Like all members of the Coenobitidae family, C. pseudorugosus’ left cheliped (i.e., first pereiopod) is notably larger than the right. The geometry and coloration of the chela, or pincer, is distinct from C. rugosus: the inferior margin of the propodus is distally straight and proximally angulated, approximating an irregular pentagonal shape. This is in contrast with C. rugosus, with convexly curved inferior margin of the propodus, forming a more rounded quadrangular shape. They also lack the dark brown patch on the lateral aspect of the chela, as commonly seen with C. rugosus.

Their left third pereiopod has a flattened dactylus and propodus, with a longitudinal crest; this is very similar to that of C. rugosus. Among males, the fifth pereiopod bears sexual tubes that are asymmetrically longer on the right side. This is in contrast to the male sexual tubes of C. rugosus, with symmetric or slight asymmetric (right longer than left) sexual tubes. This subtle difference, together with the more obvious chela appearance, are the two documented morphologic features that distinguish C. pseudorugosus from C. rugosus.

Geographical distribution 
Coenobita pseudorugosus was first described in Cebu Island, Philippines, and has also been studied in Southwest Madagascar. Their distribution beyond these two regions is not well-studied as of 2021.

Behavior and ecology 
Coenobita pseudorugosus occupy the supralittoral region, in conjunction with other terrestrial hermit crabs such as C. cavipes and C. rugosus. As with all terrestrial hermit crabs, they are subject to limited availability of empty gastropod shells that are suitable as a shelter, and thus an individual must compete with conspecifics as well as other species of terrestrial hermit crabs. Though described as preferring shells with short-to-mid height spire, they nonetheless occupy a wide variety of available shells.

Although some subtle, species-specific shell and refuge preference has been reported, they closely occupy the same ecological niche as C. rugosus; despite the overlap, the niche difference is somewhat more pronounced when compared to C. cavipes (which preferentially seek mangroves). Similar to C. rugosus, they may seek refuge in fallen leaves under bushes, mangrove roots, algal deposits along the shoreline, under boulders and between rock crevices, and even taking advantage of anthropogenic constructs (such as tombs). In unfavorable climatic conditions they may burrow into the ground as deep as 5 cm. C. pseudorugosus regularly participate in short range migration near the shoreline to forage and seek empty gastropod shells, at times exceeding 100 meters per day. Although they are generally nocturnal in behavior and most active between dusk to after dawn, they are occasionally seen migrating during the daytime as well. They generally become more active during spring tide and lower wind speed.

References 

Hermit crabs
Terrestrial crustaceans